George Samuel Schuyler (February 25, 1895 – August 31, 1977) was an American writer, journalist, and social commentator known for his conservatism after he had initially supported socialism.

Early life

George Samuel Schuyler was born in Providence, Rhode Island, to George Francis Schuyler, a chef, and Eliza Jane Schuyler (née Fischer). Schuyler's paternal great-grandfather was believed to be a black soldier working for general Philip Schuyler, whose surname the soldier adopted. Schuyler's maternal great-grandmother was an ethnic-Malagasy servant who married a ship captain from Saxe-Coburg in Bavaria.

Schuyler's father died when he was young. George spent his early years in Syracuse, New York, where his mother moved their family after she remarried. In 1912, Schuyler, at the age of 17, enlisted in the U.S. Army and was promoted to the rank of First Lieutenant, serving in Seattle and Hawaii. He went AWOL after a Greek immigrant, who had been instructed to shine Schuyler's shoes, refused to do so because of Schuyler's skin color. After turning himself in, Schuyler was convicted by a military court and sentenced to five years in prison. He was released after nine months as a model prisoner.

Socialist beginnings

After his discharge, Schuyler moved to New York City, where he worked as a handyman, doing odd jobs. During this period, he read many books which sparked his interest in socialism. He lived for a period in the Phyllis Wheatley Hotel, run by Black nationalist Marcus Garvey's Universal Negro Improvement Association (UNIA) and attended UNIA meetings. Schuyler dissented from Garvey's philosophy, and began writing about his own perspectives.

Although not fully comfortable with socialist thought, Schuyler engaged himself in a circle of socialist friends, including the Black socialist group Friends of Negro Freedom. This connection led to his employment by A. Philip Randolph and Chandler Owen's magazine, The Messenger, the group's journal. Schuyler's column, "Shafts and Darts: A Page of Calumny and Satire", came to the attention of Ira F. Lewis, manager of the Pittsburgh Courier, which was one of the leading African American newspapers in the United States. In 1924, Schuyler accepted an offer from the Courier to author a weekly column.

Early journalist days

By the mid-1920s, Schuyler had come to disdain socialism, believing that socialists were frauds who actually cared very little about Negroes. Schuyler's writing caught the eye of journalist and social critic H. L. Mencken, who wrote, "I am more and more convinced that [Schuyler] is the most competent editorial writer now in practice in this great free republic." Schuyler contributed ten articles to the American Mercury during Mencken's tenure as editor, all dealing with Black issues, and all notable for Schuyler's wit and incisive analysis. Because of his close association with Mencken, as well as their compatible ideologies and sharp use of satire, Schuyler during this period was often referred to as "the Black Mencken."

In 1926, the Pittsburgh Courier sent Schuyler on an editorial assignment to the South, where he developed his journalistic protocol: ride with a cab driver, then chat with a local barber, bellboy, landlord, and policeman. These encounters would precede interviews with local town officials. In 1926, Schuyler became the Chief Editorial Writer at the Courier. That year, he published a controversial article entitled "The Negro-Art Hokum" in The Nation, in which he claimed that because blacks have been influenced by Euroamerican culture for 300 years, "the Aframerican is merely a lampblacked Anglo-Saxon" and that no distinctly "negro" style of art exists in the USA. Langston Hughes's "The Negro Artist and the Racial Mountain", a response to Schuyler's piece, appeared in the same magazine. Schuyler objected to the segregation of art by race, writing about a decade after his "Negro-Art Hokum" in an essay that appeared in The Courier in 1936: "All of this hullabaloo about the Negro Renaissance in art and literature did stimulate the writing of some literature of importance which will live. The amount, however, is very small, but such as it is, it is meritorious because it is literature and not Negro literature. It is judged by literary and not by racial standards, which is as it should be."

In 1929, Schuyler's pamphlet Racial Inter-Marriage in the United States called for solving the country's race problem through miscegenation, which was then illegal in most states.

In 1931, Schuyler published Black No More, which tells the story of a scientist who develops a process that turns black people to white, a book that has since been reprinted twice. Two of Schuyler's targets in the book were Christianity and organized religion, reflecting his innate skepticism of both. His mother had been religious but not a regular churchgoer. As Schuyler aged, he held both white and black churches in contempt. Both, in his mind, contained ignorant, conniving preachers who exploited their listeners for personal gain. White Christianity was viewed by Schuyler as pro-slavery and pro-racism. In an article for the American Mercury entitled Black America Begins to Doubt, Schuyler wrote: "On the horizon loom a growing number of iconoclasts and Atheists, young black men and women who can read, think and ask questions; and who impertinently demand to know why Negroes should revere a god that permits them to be lynched, Jim-Crowed, and disenfranchised".

He also positively reviewed Georg Brandes' book Jesus: A Myth in an article called "Disrobing Superstition." In his review, Schuyler states:"It is doubtful whether any intelligent person accepts the Jesus Christ of the Scriptures as a fact. His alleged exploits, career, death and resurrection can only be wholly swallowed by the same gullible folk who swarm into the sideshows at Coney Island; who believe that George Washington never told a lie; that Congressmen are exceptionally honorable; that the YMCA is something other than a training school for young babbits, or that the common people rule this country. The reviewer ditched this Jesus Myth about the same time that he threw Santa Claus overboard; i.e., at the age of eight.

Now comes Mister Brandes, the noted Danish critic. He cleans up for this old myth in a very effective manner. His disposal of Jesus will satisfy most any rational being, that is to say, it will satisfy about one-twentieth of the people. The rest want to believe such myth because of the satisfaction and compensation they derive therefrom. If they didn't swallow the Jesus Myth, they would be worshipping Buddha, Osiris or Jupiter. Mentally inferior people must worship something or somebody. Thus, while this book will be read with interest by the intelligent minority, it will be shoved into the trash can with shocked silence by Baptists, Catholics, Methodists, Holy Rollers, Christian Scientists, Rotarians and such folk.

The author holds that Jesus is as much a myth as William Tell. . . . The author's criticism is always keen and searching. . . . This is probably the most Spirited and iron-clad attack that has ever been written on the authenticity of the so-called Savior of Mankind." 
Between 1936 and 1938 Schuyler published in the Pittsburgh Courier a weekly serial, which he later collected and published as a novel entitled Black Empire. He also published the highly controversial book Slaves Today: A Story of Liberia, a novel about the slave trade created by former American slaves who settled Liberia in the 1820s.

In the 1930s, Schuyler published scores of short stories in the Pittsburgh Courier under various pseudonyms. He was published in many prestigious black journals, including Negro Digest, The Messenger, and W.E.B. Du Bois's The Crisis. Schuyler's journalism also appeared in such mainstream magazines as The Nation and Common Ground, and in such newspapers as The Washington Post and The New York Evening Post (forerunner of the New York Post).

Shift in politics

From 1937 to 1944, Schuyler was the business manager of the NAACP. During the McCarthy Era, Schuyler moved sharply to the political right and would later contribute to American Opinion, the journal of the John Birch Society.

In 1947, he published The Communist Conspiracy against the Negroes. His conservatism was a counterpoint to the predominant liberal philosophy of the civil rights movement in the 1960s and 1970s. In 1964, Schuyler wrote a controversial opinion column in the ultraconservative Manchester Union Leader that opposed Martin Luther King Jr.'s being awarded the Nobel Peace Prize. He wrote, "Dr. King's principal contribution to world peace has been to roam the country like some sable Typhoid Mary, infecting the mentally disturbed with perversions of Christian doctrine, and grabbing fat lecture fees from the shallow-pated."

Schuyler opposed the Civil Rights Act of 1964. While acknowledging that white discrimination against blacks was "morally wrong, nonsensical, unfair, un-Christian and cruelly unjust", he opposed federal action to coerce changes in public attitudes. "New countries have a passion for novelty," he wrote, "and a country like America, which grew out of conquest, immigration, revolution and civil war, is prone to speed social change by law, or try to do so, on the assumption that by such legerdemain it is possible to make people better by force." Despite the inherent unfairness of racial discrimination, he considered federal intrusion into private affairs an infringement on individual liberty, explaining that "it takes lots of time to change social mores, especially with regard to such hardy perennials as religion, race and nationality, to say nothing of social classes."

In 1964, he ran for the United States House of Representatives in New York's 18th congressional district on the Conservative Party ticket and endorsed Republican candidate Barry Goldwater for president. The Couriers leadership disallowed Schuyler's title of associate editor. A formal refutation was communicated in a letter to the editor of the New York Times, signed by Courier Associate Publisher and Editor Percival L. Prattis, who had been a long-time friend since the 1920s.

In the 1960s, Schuyler, who had earlier supported the rights of Black South Africans, was led by his anticommunism to oppose taking any action against South African apartheid, saying in a radio broadcast, "In South Africa you have a system of apartheid. That's their business. I don't think it's the business of other people to change their society."

Outlets for Schuyler's written work diminished until he was a more obscure figure by the time of his death in 1977. As the liberal black writer Ishmael Reed notes in his introduction to a 1999 republication of Black No More, Schuyler's 1931 race satire, in the final years of Schuyler's life, it was considered taboo in black circles even to interview the aging writer.

He wrote a syndicated column (1965–1977) for the North American Newspaper Alliance.

Schuyler's autobiography, Black and Conservative, was published in 1966.

Influence
Schuyler was influenced by Black Muslims and people like H. G. Wells, and in turn he affected future generations. In 1973 writers Ishmael Reed and Steve Cannon interviewed Schuyler about his career and controversy for Reed's publication Yardbird II.

Family
Schuyler married Josephine Lewis Cogdell, a liberal white Texan heiress and writer, in 1928. Their daughter, Philippa Schuyler (1931–1967), was a child prodigy and noted concert pianist, who later followed in her father's footsteps and embarked on a career in journalism. In 1967 Phillipa was killed on an assignment in Vietnam for the Manchester Union Leader. Josephine Schuyler died by suicide two years later.

Selected writings
 Slaves Today: A Story of Liberia, 1931
 Black No More: Being an Account of the Strange and Wonderful Workings of Science in the Land of the Free, A.D. 1933–1940, 1931
 Devil Town: An Enthralling Story of Tropical Africa (novella; published pseudonymously in the Pittsburgh Courier, June–July 1933)
 Golden Gods: A Story of Love, Intrigue and Adventure in African Jungles (novella; published pseudonymously in the Pittsburgh Courier, December 1933 – February 1934)
 The Beast of Bradhurst Avenue: A Gripping Tale of Adventure in the Heart of Harlem (novella; published pseudonymously in the Pittsburgh Courier, March–May 1934)
 Strange Valley (novella; published pseudonymously in the Pittsburgh Courier, August–November 1934)
 Black Empire, 1936–38, 1993 (originally published pseudonymously in the Pittsburgh Courier in serial form as two separate works under the titles "The Black Internationale" and "Black Empire")
 Ethiopian Stories, 1995 (originally published pseudonymously in the Pittsburgh Courier in serial form as two separate works entitled "The Ethiopian Murder Mystery" and "Revolt in Ethiopia")
 Black and Conservative: the Autobiography of George Schuyler, Arlington House, 1966. ASIN: B000O66XD8
 Rac(e)ing to the Right: Selected Essays of George S. Schuyler, 2001

See also
 African American
 African American culture
 African American history
Africanfuturism
 Afrofuturism
 American literature
 List of African-American writers
 Black conservatism in the United States

References

Further reading
 Buni, Andrew (1974). Robert L. Vann of the Pittsburgh Courier: Politics and Black Journalism, University of Pittsburgh Press, Digital Edition.
 Scruggs, Charles (1984). The Sage in Harlem: H. L. Mencken and the Black Writers of the 1920s, The Johns Hopkins University Press. .
 Ferguson, Jeffrey (2005). The Sage of Sugar Hill: George S. Schuyler and the Harlem Renaissance, Yale University Press, .
 
 Ebeling, Richard M., "George S. Schuyler, Anti-Racist Champion of Liberty", American Institute for Economic Research, August 19, 2019

External links

 George S. Schuyler FBI file by the Federal Bureau of Investigation
 
 John Simkin, "George Schuyler" at Spartacus-Educational

1895 births
1977 deaths
20th-century African-American writers
20th-century American male writers
20th-century American non-fiction writers
20th-century American novelists
African-American atheists
African-American journalists
African-American novelists
Afrofuturist writers
American atheists
American columnists
American male non-fiction writers
American male novelists
American people of Malagasy descent
American political writers
American science fiction writers
Black conservatism in the United States
Conservative Party of New York State politicians
John Birch Society
United States Army officers
Writers from Providence, Rhode Island